Aleksandr Valeryevich Orlov (born February 21, 1981) is a Russian long-distance runner.

International competitions

References

1981 births
Living people
Russian male long-distance runners
Russian Athletics Championships winners